My Music may refer to:

 My Music (radio), a British radio panel show which premiered on the BBC Home Service on 3 January 1967
My Music (Television programme), based on the radio show
 My Music (television), an Albanian television channel, part of DigitAlb
 My Music (album), a 2005 album by Bosnian alternative rock band Sikter
 My Music (record label), a Polish independent label
 My Music, a series of television specials produced by TJ Lubinsky
 My Music, a special folder on the hard drive of a computer with a Microsoft Windows operating system, related to My Documents
 "My Music" (song), a 1973 song by Loggins and Messina from their Full Sail LP
 MyMusic, an online transmedia sitcom created by The Fine Brothers in 2012